Macron S.p.A. is an Italian sporting apparel company, based in Crespellano, Bologna. It is considered a European leader in the production of active sportswear.

Macron operates in three main business areas:

 Teamwear: for football, basketball, rugby, volleyball, baseball, handball, five-a-side football, and running.
 Merchandising: official kits, free-time apparel, and accessories for the supporters of Macron's sponsored clubs.
 Leisurewear: sports-inspired apparel for those wishing to wear Macron off the field.

History

Macron was founded in 1971 as a distributor of American sportswear brands in Italy. A major expansion of the organization took place in 1994, coincident with relocation and consolidation to Crespellano.

Macron began providing teamwear to professional football in 2001, its first contract being with Bologna. Expansion beyond the domestic Italian market began in 2005.

In 2014, Macron secured a four-year agreement with Bolton Wanderers for naming rights to their home stadium, resulting in renaming in July 2014 to Macron Stadium. Macron supplanted Reebok as the stadium namesake, and will provide the club's kit.

Corporate governance
, Macron's chief executive officer (CEO) was Gianluca Pavanello. and the company's president was Francesco Bromioli.

Sponsorships and customers 

Macron sponsors or make a variety of organizations, teams and, events. In many cases, the wording of published accounts does not make a clear demarcation between a case where a team has purchased kit (aka uniforms or strip) versus those whose kit has been provided as a matter of sponsorship.  The following is a partial list of these sponsorship/customer relationships.

Associations

 South Australian Futsal League
 Hallmark Security League
 Isthmian League
 Baseball League
 División de Honor

Australian rules football 

  Port Adelaide

Baseball

 Rouen Baseball 76
 Club Godo
 Bbc Grosseto
 Fortitudo Bologna
 Nettuno
 Parma
 Rimini
 San Marino Baseball Club
 Corendon Kinheim

Basketball

National teams
 Albania
 Australia
 Great Britain
 Ireland
 Italy  (From 2023)
 Lebanon
 Malta 
  North Macedonia  (From 2022)
 Norway 
 U.A.E.

Club teams

 Phoenix Brussels
 Borik Puntamika
 Dubrovnik
 Zabok
 Zagreb
 FC Nantes
 Stade Clermontois
 Bamberg
 Ludwigsburg
 Spartaki-Tskhinvali Tbilisi
 Alba Fehérvár
 Hapoel Jerusalem B.C
 Benetton Basket
 Recanati
 Fortitudo Agrigento
 Pallacanestro Varese
 Sutor Montegranaro
  Pallacanestro Reggiana  (From 2021 - 2022 season).
 Virtus Bologna
 Faenza Basket Project Girls
 Casale Monferrato
 Basket Femminile Le Mura Lucca  (From 2021 - 2022 season).
 Andrea Costa Imola Basket
 Aurora Basket Jesi
 Gor Mahia
 Gulbenes Buki
 Panevėžio Lietkabelis
 Klaipėdos Neptūnas
 Utenos Juventus
 Wydad AC
 Mouloudia Club Oujda
 Donar
 Wisła Kraków
 Académica de Coimbra
 Oliveirense Basquetebol
 Sporting CP
 Vagos
 BCA Pitesti
 CSM Satu Mare
 BC Triumph Lyubertsy
 BC Severstal
 KB Prishtina
 KK Union Olimpija
 KK Splošna Plovba Portorož
 CB Collado Villalba
 Meridiano Alicante
 Guadalajara Basket
 BC Dnipro
 Ferro-ZNTU
 BC Grifoni
 BK Mavpi Cherkassy

Esports
 Team BDS

Football

International confederations
 UEFA (Referee kits only)

National teams

Africa

Asia

Americas

Europe

 (From July 2023)

Oceania

Domestic leagues
 Canadian Premier League
  Football League
 Maltese Football Referees
 Ligi Kuu Tanzania Bara

Referees
Macron is also the official referee kits supplier for the leagues:

  UEFA competitions
  Liga Dominicana de Fútbol
  La Liga
  Parva Liga

Club teams

Albania 
 Burreli
 Korabi
 Partizani
 Teuta

Algeria 
 MC El Bayadh
 MC Oran
 NC Magra
 Paradou AC

Angola 
 Clube Recreativo e Desportivo do Libolo
 Petróleos de Luanda
 Sagrada Esperança

Armenia 
 BKMA
 Noravank

Aruba 
 Estrella

Australia 
 Adelaide United
 Armadale
 Avondale
 Bendigo City
 Brunswick Zebras
 Clifton Hill
 Gepps Cross Knights Futsal Club
 Inter Lions
 Keilor Park
 Langwarrin
 Melbourne Knights
 Melbourne Victory   (From 2021-2022)
 Mount Lilydale Old Collegians
 Peninsula Power
 Perth
 Perth Glory
 Point Cook
 Port Adelaide Football Club
 Sandringham
 Sutherland Sharks
 Werribee City
 Whittlesea Ranges
 Olympic Kingsway SC

Austria 
 SKN St. Pölten
 F.C. Wacker Innsbruck

Bahrain 
 Muharraq

Belgium 
 Club Brugge
 Sint-Truidense V.V.
 Brussels

Belarus 
 Gomel
 FC Minsk
 Torpedo Minsk

Bosnia and Herzegovina 
 Zrinjski Mostar
 Željezničar

Bulgaria 
 CSKA Sofia
 Botev Plovdiv
 Inter Dobrich
 Akademik Svishtov

Cameroon 
 Canon    (From 2022-2023)

Canada 
 Alliance United FC
 Atlético Ottawa
 Calgary Foothills FC
 Cavalry FC
 Edmonton Scottish
 FC Edmonton
 FC Manitoba
 Forge FC
 HFX Wanderers FC
 Montreal Manic
 Oakville Blue Devils FC
 Pacific FC
 Sigma FC
 Valour FC
 Vaughan Azzurri
 Victoria Highlanders
 York United FC

Chile 
 Audax Italiano 
 Cobreloa 
 Santiago Wanderers
 Club Deportes La Serena

Croatia 
 HNK Hajduk Split
 NK Hrvatski Dragovoljac
 NK Karlovac
 HNK Segesta
 HNK Šibenik
 NK Zagreb

Cyprus 
 AEZ Zakakiou
 Karmiotissa Polemidion
 APOEL Nicosia FC
 Omonia Nicosia
 AEL Limassol

Czech Republic 
 FC Viktoria Plzeň

Denmark 
 AaB

Egypt 
 Nogoom

England 
 Accrington Stanley (from 2023-2024 season) 
 AFC Portchester
 AFC Totton
 Blackburn Rovers
 Bolton Wanderers
 Bradford City
 Bristol Rovers
 Brixham A.F.C.
 Daventry Town
 Colchester United
 Crystal Palace
 Droylsden
 Eastbourne Borough
 Falmouth Town
 Glebe
 Farsley
 Gillingham 
 Gloucester City
 Grays Athletic
 Grimsby Town
 Guiseley AFC
 Hastings United
 Leek Town
 Lincoln Ladies
 Maidstone United
 Margate
 Morecambe F.C.
 Nottingham Forest 
 Oxford City
  Oxford United
 Porthleven
 Reading 
 Redbridge
 Ruan Minor
 Salisbury City
 Scunthorpe United
 Sheffield Wednesday
 Shepshed Dynamo
 Southend United
 Stafford Rangers
 Stevenage
 Stoke City
 Tamworth
 Thatcham Town
 Walthamstow F.C.
 Wealdstone 
 Weymouth
 Windsor
 Worcester City

Ethiopia 
 Saint George

France 
 Gazélec Ajaccio
 AJ Auxerre
 CA Bastia
 FC Nantes
 OGC Nice  (Until 2022-2023 season)

Georgia 
 Dinamo Batumi
 Torpedo Kutaisi (From 2023-24 season)

Germany 
 Arminia Bielefeld 
 Carl Zeiss Jena 
 Hannover 96
 Hannover 96 II 
 Karlsruher SC
 SV Lippstadt 08
 SV Sandhausen

Gibraltar
 FC Magpies   (From 2022-2023 season)
 Manchester 62

Greece 
 Apollon Smyrni
 Asteras Tripolis
 PAOK
 Doxa Drama
 Kavala
 Lamia
 Niki Volos
 Pierikos
 Egaleo

Hong Kong 
 Southern District FC
 Tai Po FC

Hungary 
 PMFC
 Budapest Honvéd

Iceland 
 Vikingur Reykjavik
 Fylkir
 Valur
 HK
 Hörður Í.

Ireland 
 Salthill Devon
 Longford Town

Italy 
 Bologna  (since 2001)
 Casale 
 Delta Calcio Rovigo 
 Fermana
 Giana Erminio
 Gavorrano
 Giacomense
 Grosseto
 Hellas Verona
 Padova
 Piacenza
 Reggiana 
 Ravenna
 Sampdoria
 Savona
 Spal
 Seregno
 Trapani
 Treviso
 Tritium C. 1908 
 Udinese 
 Varesina
 Vis Pesaro
 Bardolino (women's football)
 Chiasiellis (women's football)
 ASD Riviera di Romagna (women's football)
 Zensky Padova Femminile (women's football)

Kazakhstan 
 Caspiy  (From 2021-2022 season)

Kosovo 
 Drita  (From 2019-2020 season) 
 Dukagjini  (From 2021-2022 season)
 Llapi  (From 2021-2022 season)
 Ferizaj  (From 2021-2022 season)

Kuwait 
 Al-Arabi SC

Latvia 
 Jelgava

Lebanon 
 Salam Sour

Lithuania 
 Klaipeda
 Mazeikiai
 Siauliai

Luxembourg 
 Differdange

North Macedonia 
 Metalurg Skopje
 KF Shkëndija
 FK Rudar Probistip
 FC Struga

Malawi 
 Be Wanderers

Mali 
 Djoliba

Malta 
 Gudja United
 Mosta
 Sirens

Morocco 
 MCO  (From 2022/2023 season)
 UTS
 WAC

The Netherlands 
 Dordrecht
 FC Eindhoven
 Kozakken Boys
 Overamstel
 SC Heerenveen (From 2022/2023 season)
 SV Slikkerveer

Norway 
 Åsane
 Kristiansund Ballklubb
 Sandefjord Fotball
 Sandnes Ulf
 Start
 Nest-Sotra

Northern Ireland 
 Crusaders F.C.
 Lisburn Distillery F.C.

Oman 
 Dhofar
 Al-Musannah
 Al-Nasr
 Al-Shabab

Poland 
 Lech Poznań
 Raków Częstochowa
 Wisła Kraków
  Widzew Łódź  (From 2023-2024 season)

Portugal 
 Vitória de Guimarães
 Famalicão
 Penafiel
 Académico de Viseu
 Casa Pia

Romania 
 Argeș Pitești
 Dinamo București
 CS Mioveni
 Carmen București

Russia 
 Inter Cherkessk

Rwanda 
 Gasogi United FC
  A.S. Kigali

Scotland 
 Arbroath
 Dundee
 Dundee United
 Motherwell
 Queen's Park
 Queen of the South
 St Johnstone

Serbia 
 Crvena Zvezda
 FK Radnički Niš
 KFK Ravna Gora
 FK Rad

Slovenia 
 NK Bela Krajina
 NK Ljubljana

Somalia  
 Raadsan

Slovakia 
 AS Trenčín
 Dunajská Streda

South Korea 
 Incheon United FC
 Cheonan City FC
 Daejeon Hana Citizen

Spain 
 Burgos
   Cádiz 
 SD Formentera
 Deportivo La Coruña
 Gestesa Guadalajara
 Levante
 UD Logroñés  (From 2022 - 2023 season)
 Marfil Santa Coloma
 SD Noja
 CD Ourense
 Real Sociedad 
 Sestao River
 Salamanca (co-branded Sydnay)
 Villalba
 Xacobeo 2010 Lobelle

Sweden 
 MD FF Köping

Switzerland 
 Basel
 Chiasso
 Olympique de Genève
 Sion
 Thun

Tahiti 
 Pueu
 Temanava

Tunisia 
 CS Hammam-Lif
 Club Sportif Sfaxien
 Étoile du Sahel

Turkey 
 Samsunspor
 Trabzonspor
 Yeni Malatyaspor

Ukraine 
 Rukh Lviv
 Uzhhorod
 ODEK Orzhiv
 Sevlyush Vynohradiv
 Hatne

United Arab Emirates 
 Baniyas
 Dubai City
 Khor Fakkan
 Al-Wasl  (From 2022/2023 season)

United States 
 Miami FC

Uzbekistan 
 FK Andijan
 FK Buxoro

Wales 
 Afan Lido
 Airbus UK Broughton
 Bangor City
 Carmarthen Town AFC
 Colwyn Bay
 Haverfordwest County
 Holywell Town
 Llandudno
 Llanidloes Town
 Port Talbot Town
 Penycae
 Wrexham

Futsal

Domestic Leagues 
 South Australian Futsal League
 Adelaide Fusion Futsal Club
 Gepps Cross Knights Futsal Club
 Pro Futsal Macron state futsal league

Club teams 
 Sporting CP

Handball

National teams

Club teams

 64 Billere Handball
 Pallamano Spallanzani Casalgrande
 Pallamano Modena
 ASK Riga
 SK Dobele
 SK Ludza
 Belenenses
 Sporting CP
 Norwich HC
 Liberti San Bernardo
 Xico De Holanda
 CB Mar Alicante
 MMTS Kwidzyn
 Lumwana Radiants FC

Rugby Union

National teams
 
  (From 2022)

Club teams

 Bath Rugby
 Newcastle Falcons
 Northampton Saints
 Sale Sharks
 Biarritz Olympique
 USON équipe de Nevers
 Section Paloise
 Lyon OU
 Amatori Rugby Alghero
 Firenze
 Frascati
 Rugby Rovigo
 Rugby Roma Olimpic
 Academica Coimbra
 Edinburgh Rugby
 Glasgow Warriors
 Les Abelles
 Cardiff Blues
 Neath RFC
 Merthyr RFC
 Scarlets
 Ospreys as of 2023

Rugby League
 Canada Rugby League
 Catalans Dragons
 Featherstone Rovers
 Parramatta Eels
 Sheffield Eagles
 Newcastle Thunder
 Wakefield Trinity
 North American Rugby League

Weightlifting
 Italy

Volleyball

National teams

 (men's team) 
 (men's team)
 (men's team)

Club teams

 VC Argex Duvel
 OK Mladost
 Panathinaikos V.C.
 Falck Parnu VK
 Paris
 SSC Palmberg Schweriner
 Cariparma Parma Volley
 Monza
 Pallavolo Modena
 :it:Pallavolo Impavida Ortona
 Yoga Volley Forlì
 Zinella Volley Bologna
 M.Roma Volley
 Cavriago Volley
 Pallavolo Donoratico
 Robur Tiboni Volley Urbino
 Sisley Volley Treviso
 Top Team Volley Mantova
 Busto Arsizio
 Ansan OK Financial Group Okman
 Biolar Ozolnieki
 VK Ezerzeme
 Next Volley
 Budowlani Lodz
 Associacao Academica de Espinho
 Ginasio Clube Vilacondense
 Sporting CP
 Sporting Espinho
 Ribeirense
 Zorkyi
 Jurmash Major
 Leningradka
 Yaroslavich Yaroslav
 Lokomotiv Novosibirsk
 Ugra Samotlor
 Ufimochka
 Arona Tenerife Sud
 Murcia Volley
 CV Jamper Aguere
 Espérance de Tunis
 Étoile du Sahel V.C.
 Cherkasy VK
 Novator VK

Wheelchair power hockey
 Warriors Viadana Wheelchair Hockey

Wrestling

Notes and references

Notes

References

External links

 

Sportswear brands
Clothing companies of Italy
Sporting goods manufacturers of Italy
Companies based in Emilia-Romagna
Province of Bologna
Privately held companies of Italy
Italian companies established in 1971
Italian brands
Clothing companies established in 1971